Mohamed Khadhar Ibrahim is a Kenyan lawyer and a justice of the Supreme Court of Kenya.

Supreme Court Judge Interviews
In June 2012, he was among 5 Justices nominated  to the Supreme Court of Kenya by the Judicial Service Commission (Kenya) which had interviewed 25 applicants.

Supreme Court Career 

When the first round of the presidential election took place on March 4, 2013. Uhuru Kenyatta was declared the president-elect of Kenya by the Independent Electoral and Boundaries Commission. Raila Odinga challenged this in the Supreme Court of Kenya. He was one of the six judges who dismissed the petition on March 30, 2013.

On June 16, 2016, Dr. Willy Mutunga who had served as the Chief Justice since June 2011 opted for early retirement and named Justice Ibrahim - the senior-most of the Judges left in the Court - as the acting President of the Supreme Court pending the recruitment of a substantive Chief Justice.

Vetting
After an initial round of vetting, the Kenya Judges and Magistrates Vetting Board found Justice Ibrahim unfit to serve due to a tendency to delay judgments and rulings while serving as a High Court judge. He was however found suitable to serve after fresh vetting.

See also
 Supreme Court of Kenya

References

Living people
21st-century Kenyan judges
1956 births